Indians in French Guiana are mostly Indian descendants of Tamil, Telugu, and other South Indian ancestry whose ancestors were indentured labourers from India who came to French Guiana in the late 19th to early 20th-century.

Migration history
Between 1838 and 1917 there were 19,276 Indian immigrants to French Guiana.
Labour from India began to enter French Guiana beginning in 1862. By the mid-1880s, however, the British stopped shipments of Indians in response to allegations that the French were ill-treating indentured to the Indian workers under their employ.

Notable people
Lotus Vingadassamy-Engel

See also
 Indians in France
 Indo-Caribbean
 Indians in Guadeloupe
 Indo-Martiniquais
 Tamils in France

References

Ethnic groups in French Guiana
Guiana
French Guiana
French Guiana